The Ivy is a restaurant located at 113 N. Robertson Boulevard in Los Angeles founded and owned by chef Richard Irving and interior designer Lynn von Kersting. They run the restaurant alongside their daughter India von Kersting Irving. Open since 1983, The Ivy is known for its historic significance to the LA food scene, its popularity with celebrities, its distinctively colourful interiors and its simple, classic higher priced menu.

Along with The Ivy, the family also own and run Ivy at the Shore on Ocean Avenue in Santa Monica, Dolce Isola: The Ivy Bakery in Beverlywood, and boutique interiors and homeware shop Indigo Seas, located across the street from The Ivy on Robertson Boulevard.

Ivy at the Shore 
In 1985, Irving and von Kersting opened Ivy at the Shore on Ocean Avenue, near the Santa Monica pier. Ivy at the Shore serves a similar menu to The Ivy in a relaxed, tropical atmosphere with a scenic view of the Pacific Ocean, and features a front patio overlooking the ocean and a large outdoor garden in back. Shortly after its opening, it was acclaimed as ‘the restaurant of the year’ by Sharon Boorstin of the Los Angeles Herald Examiner.

Dolce Isola: The Ivy Bakery 
Irving and von Kersting opened Dolce Isola: The Ivy Bakery in 2007 inspired by Irving’s original LA Desserts bakery. Located at 2869 South Robertson, the bakery serves a shortened version of The Ivy menu with classics such as crab cakes, chopped salad, and chocolate chip cookies as well as sandwiches, pastries, seasonal gelato, coffee and juices. Dolce Isola supplies desserts to the restaurants and also sells personalized occasion cakes.

Celeb hotspot 
The area around The Ivy on Robertson Boulevard is crowded with boutiques; paparazzi shooting for Us Weekly, In Touch or Life & Style; and tourists with "the largest herd of bulb flashers... found directly across the street from The Ivy, where stars and stargazers alike dine". An MSNBC article called The Ivy "a celebrity beehive that sees a constant stream of Hummers, Mercedes and Jaguars pull up and discharge folks who pay through the nose to be seen eating in public".

Notable patrons
Lil' Kim and her "raucous entourage", "kept the sidecars flowing till closing at the tony Robertson Boulevard restaurant" while she was in Los Angeles working on her third solo album, according to a 2002 Los Angeles Times story. Paris Hilton's brother Barron held a birthday "bash" at The Ivy in 2004.

References

External links
 

Restaurants in Los Angeles